Ali ibn Mahziar al-Ahvazi was an early and prominent Shia religious judicial scholar, narrator and scholar. Mahziar was a ninth-century scholar and companion of Ali al-Rida (Reza), Muhammad al-Jawad, Ali al-Hadi, and Hasan al-Askari, the eighth, ninth, tenth, and eleventh of the Twelve Imams. Also, he was their agent in some areas particularly Ahvaz. Mahziar learned Islamic jurisprudence from these Shia Imams. Shia scholars accepted his religious narrates about the Fourteen Infallibles with complete confidence. Al-Ahvazi is noted for his writings, including a Kitab al-malahim [Book of Prophecies], as well as a Kitab al-qa'im.

Mahziar was born in Hendijan but owing to the fact that Hendijan was Doraq (today known as Shadegan) city suburban he was known as Doraq resident. His father was Christian, but in his youth along with his father converted to Islam. Later he stayed in Ahvaz.

The time of his death is unknown, but presumably he died during Hasan al-Askari'a era. There is holy shrine of Ali ibn Mahziar in Ahvaz.

Ali al-Ridha, the eighth Shia Imam, entered Ahvaz on his way to Khorasan and stayed in the city, since Al-Ma'mun, Abbasid caliph, commanded to transfer Ali al-Ridha to Khorasan from Medina. A few days later, on Ali al-Ridha's accommodation, a mosque named Masjed Al-Redha was built which Ali ibn Mahziar's body buried in it according to his will. There is a salon, in the western part next-door to the grave. It's supposed to be the mosque that mentioned before.

Works 
Among Ali ibn Mahziar Ahvazi's works are as follows:

"Ablution", "Salah", "Zakat", "Fasting", "Hajj", "Divorce", "Virtues", "Examples", "Prayer", "Luxury and Marwah", "Shrine", "Rejection "On the grain", "wills", "inheritance", "khums", "martyrdom", "virtues of the believers", "taqiyyah", "hunting", "drinking", "vow of faith" and "atonement", "limits", " Diyat "," Ataq and Tadbir "," Trades and Rents "," Makaseb "," Tafsir ".

Teachers 
Among the teachers of Ali Ibn Mahziar Ahvazi:

Muhammad ibn Abi Umayr, Ahmad ibn Ishaq Abhari, Ahmad ibn Muhammad ibn Abi Nasr, Hassan ibn Ali ibn Fadhal, Hamad ibn Isa, Safwan ibn Yahya, Hassan ibn Mahbub, Hussein ibn Saeed Ahwazi, Abdullah ibn Yahya, Muhammad ibn Hassan Qomi, Muhammad Ibn Ismail Ibn Bazi, Musa Ibn Qasim, ...

Letter of the 9th Shia-Imam (Al-Javad) 
The letter of the 9th Imam of the Shia Islam (Muhammad ibn Ali al-Jawad (Arabic: محمد بن علي الجواد), about Ali bin Mahziyar Ahwazi:

"O Ali, may God reward you well and make you dwell in his paradise, and protect you from humiliation in this world and the hereafter, and may he gather you with us... If I say that I have not seen anyone like you, I hope that I have spoken the truth "

References

Iranian Shia scholars of Islam
People from Ahvaz
People from Khuzestan Province
People from Shadegan
Hadith narrators
Shia scholars of Islam
Iranian Shia Muslims
Shia Islamic holy places

External links
 New Zarih Unveiled at Ali ibn Mahziar Shrine in Ahvaz